Diocese of Quebec may refer to;

Anglican Diocese of Quebec, founded by Letters Patent in 1793
Roman Catholic Archdiocese of Quebec, the oldest Catholic see in the New World north of Mexico